Lambert Peter Wigle (June 17, 1867 – October 3, 1941) was a Canadian farmer and political figure in Ontario. He represented Essex South in the Legislative Assembly of Ontario from 1914 to 1919 and from 1934 to 1937 as a Liberal member.

He was born in Gosfield, Essex County, the son of Philip Wigle, a United Empire Loyalist of Pennsylvania Dutch descent, and Hannah Wright. In 1900, he married Jennie Grainger. Wigle served as reeve of Gosfield South for seven years and also was a member of the council for Essex County. He died October 3, 1941.

References

External links

1867 births
1941 deaths
Ontario Liberal Party MPPs